Kazimierz Sidorczuk (born March 4, 1967 in Debno) is a former Polish footballer (goalkeeper) playing most of the career in Lech Poznań. He also played for Sturm Graz. He finished his career in Kapfenberger SV, with whom he once scored a goal.

He played for Poland 14 times.

Achievements 
 three times championship of Poland with Lech Poznań
 once winner Polish Supercup with Lech Poznań
 two times champion of Austria with Sturm Graz
 two times winner of Austrian Cup with Sturm Graz

References

1967 births
Living people
Sportspeople from Szczecin
Polish footballers
Poland international footballers
Lech Poznań players
Sokół Pniewy players
SK Sturm Graz players
Kapfenberger SV players
Association football goalkeepers